was a public junior college in Wakayama, Wakayama, Japan.

History 
It was set up in 1950, and closed in 1955.

See also
 Wakayama Medical University

References

Public universities in Japan
Japanese junior colleges
Universities and colleges in Wakayama Prefecture
1950 establishments in Japan
Educational institutions established in 1950
Educational institutions disestablished in 1955
1955 disestablishments in Japan